Justin Michael Marks (born January 12, 1988) is an American former Major League Baseball (MLB) pitcher who played for the Kansas City Royals and Tampa Bay Rays between 2014 and 2017.

Amateur career
The Boston Red Sox drafted Marks in the 37th round of the 2006 MLB Draft out of Owensboro Catholic High School in Owensboro, Kentucky, but he did not sign, opting to attend the University of Louisville, where he played college baseball for the Louisville Cardinals. In 2008, he played collegiate summer baseball with the Chatham A's of the Cape Cod Baseball League.

Professional career

Oakland Athletics
The Oakland Athletics selected Marks in the third round of the 2009 MLB Draft, and he signed. Marks spent two years in the A's farm system.

Kansas City Royals
The Royals acquired Marks and Vin Mazzaro from the Athletics for David DeJesus. After the 2012 season, he appeared in the Arizona Fall League and was added to the Royals' 40-man roster. Marks was selected for the Top Prospects Team by the AFL coaches and managers. Marks led the Arizona league with five wins while pitching for the Surprise Saguaros. During the short six-week season he went 5–1 over seven starts and a 2.59 ERA with 22 strikeouts and five walks. Marks spent most of the 2012 regular season with the Northwest Arkansas Naturals of the Class AA Texas League. He posted a 3–5 record with the Naturals with an ERA of 3.80 in 17 starts. Marks' season was interrupted however after a ball hit back to the pitcher fractured his right orbital bone.

The Royals promoted Marks from the  Omaha Storm Chasers of the Class AAA Pacific Coast League to the major leagues on April 17, 2014. He made  his debut with the Royals on April 20. He was designated for assignment on June 2, 2014.

Second stint with the Athletics
On June 6, 2014, Marks was traded to the Oakland Athletics for cash considerations and sent to the Sacramento River Cats.

Texas Rangers
On June 20, 2014, Marks was claimed off waivers by the Texas Rangers after being outrighted off the A's 40 man roster. He was released on July 25.

Arizona Diamondbacks
In November 2014, Marks signed a minor league deal with the Arizona Diamondbacks.

Tampa Bay Rays
The Tampa Bay Rays signed Marks to a minor league contract on January 19, 2016. He pitched for the Durham Bulls of the Class AAA International Leaguein which he also pitched a no-hitter for, and pitched nine innings for the Rays. During the 2016 offseason, Marks signed a new minor league contract with the Rays.

Los Angeles Dodgers
On May 9, 2017, Marks was claimed off waivers by the Los Angeles Dodgers. He was designated for assignment on June 8. He accepted his outright assignment to the minors and pitched in 31 games (6 starts) for the Triple-A Oklahoma City Dodgers in 2017. He was 4–3 with a 5.25 ERA. He elected free agency on October 2, 2017.

References

External links

Louisville Cardinals bio

1988 births
Living people
Sportspeople from Owensboro, Kentucky
Baseball players from Kentucky
Major League Baseball pitchers
Kansas City Royals players
Tampa Bay Rays players
Louisville Cardinals baseball players
Chatham Anglers players
Arizona League Athletics players
Kane County Cougars players
Stockton Ports players
Wilmington Blue Rocks players
Arizona League Royals players
Northwest Arkansas Naturals players
Omaha Storm Chasers players
Surprise Saguaros players
Sacramento River Cats players
Round Rock Express players
Reno Aces players
Charlotte Stone Crabs players
Durham Bulls players
Oklahoma City Dodgers players